Three men's 5000 metres events were held at the 2021 World Para Athletics European Championships in Bydgoszcz, Poland.

Medalists

See also
List of IPC world records in athletics

References

5000 metres
2021 in men's athletics
5000 metres at the World Para Athletics European Championships